Wilfredo Aristides Tejada Andujar (born November 12, 1962 in Santo Domingo, Dominican Republic) is a former Major League Baseball player.

External links

1962 births
Living people
Dominican Republic expatriate baseball players in Canada
Dominican Republic expatriate baseball players in Mexico
Dominican Republic expatriate baseball players in the United States
Indianapolis Indians players
Helena Phillies players
Huntsville Stars players
Jacksonville Expos players
Major League Baseball catchers
Major League Baseball players from the Dominican Republic
Minor league baseball managers
Montreal Expos players
Peninsula Pilots players
Phoenix Firebirds players
Reading Phillies players
Spartanburg Spinners players
Tacoma Tigers players
Tigres del México players